Helicobacter pylori virulence factor CagA (cytotoxin-associated gene A) is a 120–145kDa protein encoded on the 40kb cag pathogenicity island (PAI). H. pylori strains can be divided into CagA positive or negative strains. Approximately 60% of H. pylori strains isolated in Western countries carry cag PAI, whereas almost all of the East Asian isolates are cag PAI-positive.

The cag PAI also encodes for a type IV secretion system which is used to "inject" CagA into a target cell upon H. pylori attachment. After translocation, CagA localises to the inner surface of the cell membrane and undergoes tyrosine phosphorylation by Src family kinases (e.g. Fyn and Lyn).

Role in Cancer
H. pylori infection is associated with MALT lymphoma and gastric adenocarcinoma and CagA is thought to be involved in cancer development. Phosphorylated CagA is able to interact with the SHP-2 tyrosine phosphatase, rendering it functionally active, triggering a host cell morphological change to a more motile phenotype known as the "hummingbird phenotype". This phenotype mimics an effect produced by hepatocyte growth factor which may participate in various aspects of cancer, including metastasis.
CagA is also a highly antigenic protein that is associated with a prominent inflammatory response by eliciting interleukin-8 production.

The Cag PAI

References

External links 
 

Virulence factors
Helicobacter pylori
Infectious causes of cancer